This is list of lists of office holders known as governor.

Note: Years denote times when the office was called governor, not governor-general, etc.

Africa

Egypt
 List of governors of Islamic Egypt (640–1517)
 List of Ottoman governors of Egypt (1517–1805)

Italian East Africa
 List of Italian Governors of Amhara (1936–1941)
 List of colonial governors of Eritrea (1896–1941)
 List of Italian Governors of Scioa  (1939–1941)
 List of Italian Governors of Galla-Sidamo, (1936–1941)
 List of Italian Governors of Harar, (1936–1941)
 List of colonial governors of Italian Somaliland (1889–1941)

Kenya
 List of county governors of Kenya (current)
 List of colonial governors and administrators of Kenya (1905–1963, United Kingdom)

Nigeria
 Lists of Nigerian state governors
 List of governors and governors-general of Nigeria (1914–1963, United Kingdom)

South Sudan
 List of current state governors in South Sudan

Sudan
 List of current state governors in Sudan
 List of governors of pre-independence Sudan (1893–1899, United Kingdom), mostly Governor-Generals and other titles

Zimbabwe
 List of provincial governors of Zimbabwe (current)

Other

 List of Ottoman governors of Algiers
 List of colonial governors of Angola (1589–1834, Portugal)
 List of colonial governors of Cameroon (France)
 List of colonial governors of Chad (France)
 List of colonial governors of the Comoros (France)
 List of colonial governors of Dahomey (France)
 List of colonial governors of the Danish Gold Coast (1668–1850)
 List of colonial governors of Eritrea (various; 1896–1941, Italy)
 List of governors of French Somaliland
 List of colonial governors of Gabon (France)
 List of governors of the Gold Coast (1621–1960, England/United Kingdom)
 List of colonial governors of Italian Cyrenaica (1912–1935, Italy)
 List of colonial governors of Italian Tripolitania (1911–1933, Italy)
 List of colonial governors of Ivory Coast (France)
 Agents and governors of Liberia (two governors of the American Colonization Society between 1839 and 1848)
 List of colonial governors of Mali (France)
 List of colonial governors of Mozambique (1609–1836, Portugal)
 List of colonial governors of Nyasaland (1907–1964, United Kingdom)
 List of governors of Oran (Spain, Ottoman Empire)
 List of governors of Portuguese Guinea (1879–1974, Portugal)
 List of colonial and departmental heads of Réunion (France)
 List of colonial governors of Senegal (France, United Kingdom)
 List of colonial governors and administrators of Seychelles (France, United Kingdom)
 List of colonial governors of Sierra Leone (1792–1827, 1837–1961, United Kingdom)
 List of colonial governors of Spanish Guinea (1778–1781, 1859–1961, 1964, Spain)
 List of colonial governors of South West Africa (1898–1915, Germany)
 List of governors of Tanganyika (Germany, United Kingdom)
 List of governors of Tangier (1471–1662, Portugal) (1662–1684, England)
 List of colonial governors of Togo (German Empire, United Kingdom) 
 List of colonial governors of Ubangi-Shari (France), now the Central African Republic
 List of governors of Uganda (1910–1962, United Kingdom)

Ancient Rome
 Lists of Ancient Roman governors

Asia

Afghanistan
 Lists of Afghan provincial governors

India
 Lists of Indian governors, both before and after independence

Indonesia
 Lists of Indonesian provincial governors

Japan
 Lists of governors of prefectures of Japan

Malaysia
 List of governors of Penang, before and after independence

Pakistan
 Lists of Pakistani provincial governors
 List of caliphal governors of Sind (711–after 871)

Philippines
 List of current Philippine provincial governors
 Governor of Bulacan
 List of governors of Cebu

South Korea
 List of provincial-level governors in South Korea (current)

Sri Lanka
 Lists of Sri Lankan provincial governors

Thailand
 List of governors of Lop Buri
 List of governors of Surat Thani

Other
 List of colonial governors of Burma
 List of governors of Dutch Ceylon (1640–1796)
 Governor of Hong Kong (1843–1997, England/United Kingdom)
 Governors of Azerbaijan (Iran)
 List of Umayyad governors of Iraq
 Governor of Labuan (1848–1890, United Kingdom)
 Governor of North Borneo (1890–1906, North Borneo Company)
 List of governors of the Straits Settlements (1906–1942, British East India Company) (1867–1946, United Kingdom)
 Governor of Northern Rhodesia (1924–1964)
 Governor of Macau (1623–1999, Portugal)
 List of caliphal governors of Medina
 Crown Colony of Sarawak (1946–1963, United Kingdom)
 List of Governors of Singapore (British East India Company, United Kingdom)
 List of Abbasid governors of Tarsus
 List of governors of Alanya, Turkey

Europe

Austria
 Lists of Austrian state governors

Norway
 Lists of county governors of Norway

Sweden
 Lists of Swedish county governors

Other
 List of Umayyad governors of al-Andalus
 List of Ottoman governors of Bosnia
 Governor of Brittany
 List of Governors of Carlisle, England
 List of governors and heads of state of Fiume (Kingdom of Hungary and Austro-Hungarian Empire)
 List of Governors of Guernsey (12th century–1835, England/United Kingdom)
 List of governors of the Habsburg Netherlands (1501–1794)
 Governor of the Isle of Man (1595–1828, England/United Kingdom)
 Governor of Limburg (Belgium)
 List of Governors of Luxembourg (while ruled by various powers from the 15th to 19th centuries) 
 List of Governors of Malta (1801–1964, United Kingdom)
 List of governors of the Duchy of Milan
 List of governors of Siena
 List of governors of the Province of Trieste (1918–1954, various)

Mauritius
 Governor of British Mauritius (1810–1968, United Kingdom)
 Governor of Dutch Mauritius (1598–1710, Dutch East India Company)
 Governor of Isle de France (Mauritius) (1721-1810, France)

North and Central America

Canada
 List of governors of the Hudson's Bay Company
 Governor of Montreal, now in Canada (1642–1760, France) (1760–1764, United Kingdom)
 List of governors of Trois-Rivières, now in Canada (1634–1760, France) (1760–1764, United Kingdom)
 List of Governors of Vancouver Island and British Columbia, now in Canada (1849–1871, United Kingdom)

Caribbean
 List of colonial governors and administrators of Anguilla (1982–present, United Kingdom)
 List of governors of the Bahamas (1648–1973, United Kingdom)
 Governor of the Cayman Islands (1971–present, United Kingdom)
 List of colonial governors of Cuba (1511–1899, Spain, except for 1762–1763, when Cuba was captured by the British) (1899–1909, United States, except for part of 1902, when Cuba became independent)
 List of Governors of the Danish West Indies (various, 1665–1862?)
 List of colonial governors and administrators of Grenada (1649–1762, France) (1762–1802, 1967–1974, United Kingdom)
 List of colonial and departmental heads of Guadeloupe (various)
 List of governors of Jamaica (Spain, England/United Kingdom)
 List of Governors of the Leeward Islands (1671–1958, England/United Kingdom)
 List of colonial and departmental heads of Martinique (various)
 List of colonial governors of Saint-Domingue, now Haiti (France)
 Governors of Sint Eustatius, Saba and Sint Maarten (1639–1854, Netherlands)
 List of governors of Trinidad (1506–1797, Spain) (1797–1889, United Kingdom)
 List of Governors of Trinidad and Tobago (1889–1962, United Kingdom)
 Governor of the Turks and Caicos Islands (1973–present, United Kingdom)
 List of governors of the Windward Islands (United Kingdom)

Mexico
 Lists of Mexican state governors

United States
 Lists of United States governors
 Lists of governors of colonial America
 List of Texas Governors and Presidents

Other
 List of colonial governors and administrators of British Honduras
 List of governors of Greenland (1728–1979, Denmark)

Oceania

Australia
 Lists of Australian state governors

Kingdom of Hawaii
 Governors of Hawaii (island)
 Governors of Kauai
 Governors of Maui
 Governors of Oahu

Other
 Governor of Fiji (United Kingdom)
 List of colonial and departmental heads of French Polynesia
 List of colonial and departmental heads of New Caledonia (France)
 List of current state governors in Palau
 List of colonial governors of Samoa  (1900–1914, Germany)
 List of Resident Commissioners and Governors of the Solomon Islands (1953–1978, United Kingdom)

South America

Argentina
 Lists of Argentine provincial governors

Brazil
 Lists of Brazilian state governors

Colombia
 Lists of Colombian department governors

Other
 List of governors of British Guiana (1831–1966, United Kingdom)
 Royal Governor of Chile (1540–1788, Spain)
 List of Governors of the Falkland Islands (1848–1982, 1985–present, United Kingdom)
 List of colonial and departmental heads of French Guiana
 Royal Governor of Panama (1508–1818, Spain) 
 List of colonial governors of Suriname (1650–1975, back and forth between England/United Kingdom and the Netherlands)

By century
 List of governors of dependent territories in the 15th century
 List of governors of dependent territories in the 16th century
 List of governors of dependent territories in the 17th century
 List of governors of dependent territories in the 18th century
 List of governors of dependent territories in the 19th century
 List of governors of dependent territories in the 20th century
 List of governors of dependent territories in the 21st century

Banking institutions
 List of governors of the Bangladesh Bank
 Governor of the Bank of Canada
 List of governors of the Banque Centrale du Congo
 Governor of the Bank of England
 Governor of the Bank of France
 List of Governors of Reserve Bank of India
 Governor of the Central Bank of Kenya
 Governor of Central Bank of Malaysia
 List of Governors of the State Bank of Pakistan
 Governor of the National Bank of Romania
 List of governors of national banks of Serbia and Yugoslavia
 List of Governors of the Central Bank of Turkey
 Federal Reserve Board of Governors of the United States

Other
 Governor of the Military Knights of Windsor, an office of the Royal Household of the Sovereign of the United Kingdom

 
Lists of politicians